Yanes is a Spanish surname and given name. Notable people with the name include:

Surname 
 Agustín Díaz Yanes (born 1950), Spanish screenwriter and film director
 Elías Yanes Álvarez (1928–2018), Spanish Roman Catholic bishop
 Luis Yanes (born 1982), Colombian footballer
 Oscar Yanes (1927–2013), Venezuelan journalist and writer
 Hely Yánes (born 1967), Venezuelan boxer
 Romulo Yanes (1959–2021), American photographer
 Allen Yanes (born 1997), Guatemalan footballer

Given name 
 Yanes Raubaba (born 1974), Indonesian sprinter

See also
 Yáñez

Spanish-language surnames